Shahidullah Kaiser (16 February 1927 – disappeared 14 December 1971) was a Bangladeshi novelist and writer. He was awarded Bangla Academy Literary Award in 1969, Ekushey Padak in 1983 and Independence Day Award in 1998.

Early life and education
Kaiser was born in the Mazupur village (in present-day Feni District) as Abu Nayeem Mohammad Shahidullah. He studied at secondary education from Amirabad BC Laha High School, sonagazi, Feni, He also studies Presidency College, Kolkata and obtained a bachelor's degree in economics with honours. Later, he enrolled in master's of arts at Calcutta University but did not complete the degree.

Family
Kaiser's wife, Panna Kaiser, is an author and novelist. She served as a member of the parliament for the Awami League government from 1996 to 2001. Kaiser's daughter, Shomi Kaiser, is a television actress. His son, Amitav Kaiser, is a banker.

Politics and journalism
Kaiser was active in politics and cultural movements from his student days. Following the formation of Pakistan in 1947, he joined the provincial Communist Party of East Pakistan. He started working as a journalist in 1949 with the Ittefaq in Dhaka. In 1952, he participated actively in the Language Movement. For his political role in the movement for protection of Bengali language, Kaiser was arrested on 3 June 1952. He was later jailed for three and a half years. Right after his release in 1955, he was again arrested and jailed on a political crackdown on activists. A few years later he was released. In 1958, Kaiser joined as an associate editor of The Sangbad – a Bengali language daily – where he worked for the rest of his life. When the military coup of 1958 put Ayub Khan in power, and martial law was proclaimed, Kaiser was arrested again on 14 October 1958 and remained in jail for four years till his release in September 1962.

Disappearance
Kaiser collected medicine and food and delivered those to the posts such as one being Sufia Kamal's house, from where the freedom fighters picked those up for their training outpost.

At the end the Bangladesh Liberation War of 1971, the Indian Army and its local collaborators initiated a plan for killing the leading Bengali intellectuals and blaming it on the Pakistan Army to incite rebellion. As a part of it, Kaiser was rounded up on 14 December 1971. He never returned, nor was his body ever found. It is assumed that he was executed along with other intellectuals. His brother, Zahir Raihan, a notable film-maker, also disappeared while searching for Kaiser.

In early December 1971, Kaiser cautioned Sufia Kamal to leave Dhaka, but he himself did not leave and got caught in the hand of the Pakistani Army.

On 3 November 2013, Chowdhury Mueen-Uddin, a Muslim leader based in London, and Ashrafuz Zaman Khan, based in the United States, were sentenced in absentia after the court found that they were involved in the abduction and murders of 18 people – nine Dhaka University teachers, six journalists including Kaiser and three physicians – in December 1971.

Chowdhury Mueen-Uddin denied the charges in an interview aired by Al Jazeera in August 2013.

Bibliography
 Sareng Bau (The Captain's Wife, 1962)
 Rajbandir Rojnamacha (The Diary of a Political Prisoner, 1962)
 Sangshaptak (The Indomitable Soldiers, 1965)
 Peshwar Theke Tashkhand (From Peshwar to Tashkent, 1966)
 Krishnachura Megh (Delonix regia Clouds)
 Timir Balay (The Circle of Darkness)
 Digante Phuler Agun (The Flaming Horizon)
 Samudra O Trsna (Sea and Thirst)
 Chandrabhaner Kanya (Chandrabhan's Daughter)
 Kabe Pohabe Bibhabari (When Will It Dawn?) (unfinished)

Filmography
TV Series
 Songsoptok (The Indomitable Soldiers, 1971)

Awards
 Adamjee Literary Award, 1962
 Bangla Academy Literary Award, 1969
 Ekushey Padak, 1983
 Independence Day Award, 1998

See also
 1971 East Pakistan Intellectuals massacre
 List of journalists killed in Bangladesh
 List of people who disappeared

References

1927 births
1970s missing person cases
20th-century Bangladeshi male writers
20th-century novelists
Bangladeshi male novelists
Bengali novelists
Missing people
Missing person cases in Bangladesh
People from Feni District
People killed in the Bangladesh Liberation War
Presidency University, Kolkata alumni
Recipients of Bangla Academy Award
Recipients of the Adamjee Literary Award
Recipients of the Ekushey Padak
Recipients of the Independence Day Award
Surendranath Law College alumni
University of Calcutta alumni